The Long River Bridge or Longjiang Bridge (龙江特大桥) is a suspension bridge near Baoshan, Yunnan, China. The main span of the bridge is  making it one of the longest ever built. The bridge completed construction in April, 2016, and is open to public on May 1, 2016.

The project cost around 1.96 billion Yuan.

Geography
The bridge is part of S10 Baoshan–Tengchong Expressway, connecting the cities of Baoshan and Tengchong in southwest China, and going straight to Myanmar. It crosses the Long River Valley, the largest natural obstacle on the Baoteng Expressway. Prior to the bridge, going from Baoshan to Tengchong involves a  detour down to the valley floor.

See also
 List of bridges in China
 List of highest bridges
 List of longest suspension bridge spans

References

Bridges in Yunnan
Suspension bridges in China
Transport in Baoshan, Yunnan
Bridges completed in 2016